William Mair may refer to:

 William Mair (South Australian politician) (died 1897), member of the South Australian House of Assembly
 Bill Mair (1900–1964), Australian politician, member of the Victorian Legislative Council
 William Mair (chemist) (1868–1948), Scottish pharmacist and manufacturing chemist
 William Mair (moderator) (1830–1920), Scottish minister
 William Crosbie Mair (died 1831), Scottish physician
 William Gilbert Mair (1832–1912), soldier, resident magistrate, and judge in New Zealand